Mahesh Kumar Jain is an Indian banker. As of 2018, he is serving as a Deputy Governor of the Reserve Bank of India.

Career
Jain served as the MD & CEO of IDBI Bank before being appointed as the Deputy Governor of the Reserve Bank Of India. Before joining IDBI Bank, he headed Indian Bank.

References 

Living people
1961 births
Reserve Bank of India